Trazee Travel is a website that offers travel information targeting travelers under the age of 40. It is a division of FXExpress Publications, Inc., based in Yardley, Pennsylvania, which also owns Global Traveler and whereverfamily.com. It organizes the annual Trazee awards. It was launched in 2014.

References

2014 establishments in Pennsylvania
American travel websites